The  is the second season of the Bleach anime series, containing 21 episodes. The episodes are directed by Noriyuki Abe, and produced by TV Tokyo, Dentsu and Studio Pierrot. In the English release by Viz Media, the title is translated as The Entry. The season adapts Tite Kubo's Bleach manga series from the 9th volume to the 14th volume (chapters 71–117), with the exception of episode 33 (filler). The episodes' plot centers on Ichigo Kurosaki and his friends' journey to the Soul Society in order to save Soul Reaper Rukia Kuchiki from her impending execution.

The arc initially ran from March 1, to July 19, 2005 in Japan on TV Tokyo. The first English airing of the series lasted from February 11 to July 15, 2007. It was shown on YTV's Bionix programming block in Canada and Cartoon Network's Adult Swim in the United States.

The episodes use five pieces of theme music: two opening themes and three ending themes. The opening theme for the first five episodes is Orange Range's single "Asterisk"; the rest use "D-tecnoLife" by Uverworld. The initial ending theme is "Thank You!!" by Home Made Kazoku, switching at episode 26 to Younha's  and again at episode 39 to "HappyPeople" by Skoop on Somebody.

Five DVD compilations, each containing four episodes of the season, have been released by Aniplex between July 27 and November 23, 2005. The DVDs of the English adaptation of the series are distributed by Viz Media; five DVD compilations, each containing four episodes of the season, have been released by Viz Media between September 25, 2007, and May 20, 2008. In the United Kingdom, Manga Entertainment released the season in two DVD volumes on June 30 and November 3, 2008. A compilation of these two volumes was released on December 29, 2008.



Episode list

References

General

Specific

2005 Japanese television seasons
Season 02